‌Bilal Yiğit Koçak (born 12 Octobor 1995, in Samsun, Turkey), known by his stage name as Yiğit Koçak is a Turkish TV series actor, known for Kardeşlerim (2021), Kimse Bilmez (2019) and Gel Dese Ask (2020).

Early life and education 
Koçak was born on October 12, 1995, in Samsun, Turkey. His full name is Bilal Yiğit Koçak and he has a younger sister named Sera. Koçak studied at Anatolia High School in Samsun and majored in economics and finance. He graduated from Bahçeşehir University. He was nominated for an award in the "Best Actor" category at the 48th Golden Butterfly Awards ceremony on December 4, 2022.

Career

Modelling 
Koçak first worked in advertising and modeling. He made his debut in D-Smart and KFC commercials.

Acting 
Koçak has seen an acting course in "Academy 3,5" and has been acting since 2017 with the TV series Seni Kimler Aldi and began playing the role of Mehmet Çelik. In 2019, he played the role of Sinan Egilmez in the TV series Kimse Bilmez (Nobody Knows). In 2020, he played the role of Onur Pusat in the TV series Gel Dese Ask. Currently, He is one of the main actors of the TV series Kardeşlerim and plays the role of Ömer Eren. He became very popular with his successful role in this TV series.

Personal life 
Koçak has 2.5 million followers on Instagram.

Filmography

Awards and nominations

References

External links 

 
 

1995 births
Living people
Turkish male models
Male actors from Istanbul
Turkish male film actors
Turkish male television actors
21st-century Turkish male actors